Mania is a 1985 Greek adventure film directed by Giorgos Panousopoulos. It was entered into the 36th Berlin International Film Festival.

Cast
 Alessandra Vanzi as Zoi Syropoulou
 Aris Retsos
 Antonis Theodorakopoulos
 Andreas Andreopoulos
 Arto Apartian
 Yannis Goumas
 Yiorgos Kalantzis
 Ilias Kapetanidis
 Eirini Koumarianou
 Betty Livanou
 Myrto Makri
 Mei Sevastopoulou
 Nikos Skiadas
 Fanis Veloudas
 Stavros Xenidis

References

External links

1985 films
1980s Greek-language films
1980s adventure films
Films directed by Giorgos Panousopoulos
Greek adventure films